This list contains 167 songs written by American singer-songwriter Hank Williams, including those where he is credited as co-author. The songs are arranged alphabetically.

A
A Home in Heaven
A House of Gold
A House Without Love
Alabama Waltz
All the Love I Ever Had
Alone and Forsaken
Always in Love (co-written with Jimmy Fields)
Angel of Death
Angel Mine (lyrics by Williams, recorded by Sheryl Crow for The Lost Notebooks of Hank Williams)
Are You Building a Temple in Heaven?
A Mansion on the Hill (co-written with Fred Rose with possible contributions from Audrey Williams)
Are You Walkin' and a Talkin' For the Lord?
A Stranger in the Night (co-written with Bill Morgan)

B
Baby Sittin' the Blues (co-written with Jimmy Fields)
Baby, We're Really in Love
Bayou Pon Pon (co-written with Jimmie Davis)
Between You and God And Me (co-written with Lawton Williams)
Blue Is My Heart (lyrics by Williams, recorded by Holly Williams and Hank Williams, Jr. for The Lost Notebooks of Hank Williams)
The Blues Come Around
Blues Done Left Me

C
Cajun Baby (lyrics by Williams; music composed by Hank Williams, Jr.)
Cajun Baby Blues (co-written with Jimmy Fields)
California Zephyr
Calling You
Coeur Brise (co-written with William Lamothe)
Cold, Cold Heart
Come a Runnin' (co-written with Jimmy Fields)
Countryfied
Cowboys Don't Cry (lyrics by Williams, music composed by Mickey Newbury)
Crazy Mixed Up Heart (co-written with Jimmy Fields)

D
Dear Brother
Dear John
Diddy Wa Diddy
Dreamer's Paradise

E
Everything's Okay

F
For Me There Is No Place (lyrics by Williams; music composed by Hank Williams, Jr.)
Forever's a Long, Long Time (co-written with Jimmy Davis)
The Funeral

G
Got You On My Mind Once Again (co-written with Jimmy Fields and Lefty Frizzell)
Goin' Steady (Faron Young Classic) It was found out some years ago by Colin Escott (Hank Williams' Biographer) that Hank actually wrote the song and sold it to Faron.

H
Have Half a Heart (co-written with Jimmy Fields)
Heaven Holds All My Treasures
Help Me Understand
Hey Goliath
Hey Good Lookin'
Homesick (lyrics by Williams; music composed by Hank Williams, Jr.)
Honey, Do You Love Me, Huh? (co-written with Curly Williams)
Honky Tonk Blues
Honky Tonkin'
How Can You Refuse Him Now
How Many Times Have You Broken My Heart? (lyrics by Williams, recorded by Gillian Welch and Norah Jones for The Lost Notebooks of Hank Williams)
Howlin' at the Moon

I
I Ain't Got Nothin' but Time
I Can't Escape from You
I Can't Get You Off of My Mind
I Can't Help It (If I'm Still in Love with You)
I Could Never Be Ashamed of You
I Don't Care (If Tomorrow Never Comes)
(I Heard That) Lonesome Whistle (co-written with Jimmie Davis)
I Hope You Shed a Million Tears (lyrics by Williams, recorded by Vince Gill and Rodney Crowell for The Lost Notebooks of Hank Williams)
I Just Don't Like This Kind of Living
I Lost the Only Love I Knew (co-written with Don Helms)
I Saw the Light
I Told A Lie To My Heart (recorded by Willie Nelson and Hank Williams for Half Nelson)
I Wish You Didn't Love Me So Much
I Won't Be Home No More
I'd Still Want You
I'll Be a Bachelor 'Til I Die
I'll Never Get Out of This World Alive (co-written with Fred Rose)
I'm a Long Gone Daddy
I'm Blue, I'm Lonesome (co-written with Bill Monroe)
I'm Gonna Break Your Heart
(I'm Gonna) Sing, Sing, Sing
I'm Not Coming Home Anymore
I'm Praying For the Day (co-written with Pee-Wee King)
I'm So Happy I Found You (lyrics by Williams, recorded by Lucinda Williams for The Lost Notebooks of Hank Williams)
I'm So Lonesome I Could Cry
I'm Sorry for You, My Friend
I'm Yvonne Of The Bayou co-written with Jimmy Rule and likely Moon Mullican
I've Been Down That Road Before
If You Call This Loving (co-written with Jimmy Fields)

J
Jambalaya (On the Bayou)  (lyrics co-written with Moon Mullican; melody adapted from "Grand Texas")
Jesus Died for Me
Jesus Is Calling (co-written with Charlie Monroe)
Jesus Remembered Me
Just Waitin' (co-written with Bob Gazzaway)

K
Kaw-Liga (co-written with Fred Rose)

L
Last Night I Dreamed of Heaven
(Last Night) I Heard You Crying in Your Sleep
Lead Me to that Rock
Leave Me Alone with the Blues
Let the Spirit Descend
Let's Turn Back the Years
The Little House We Built (Just o'er the Hill) (co-written with Don Helms)
Little Paper Boy
The Log Train
Long Gone Lonesome Blues
Lord, Build Me a Cabin in Glory
Lord, I'm Coming Home
Lost on the River (with Audrey Williams)
The Love that Faded (lyrics by Williams, recorded by Bob Dylan for The Lost Notebooks of Hank Williams)
Low and Lonely
Low Down Blues
Lovesick Blues

M
May You Never Be Alone
Me and My Broken Heart
Men with Broken Hearts
Mind Your Own Business
Moanin' the Blues
Move It on Over
My Heart is True Confession (co-written with Jimmy Fields)
My Heart Would Know
My Love for You (Has Turned to Hate)
My Receipt for Love
My Son Calls Another Man Daddy (co-written with Jewell House)
My Sweet Love Ain't Around
My Unfaithful Heart (co-written with Jimmy Fields)

N
'Neath a Cold Gray Tomb of Stone (co-written with Mel Foree)
Never Again (Will I Knock on Your Door)
Never Been So Lonesome
No, Not Now (co-written with Curley Williams)
Nobody's Lonesome for Me

O
Oh, Mama, Come Home (lyrics by Williams, recorded by Jacob Dylan for The Lost Notebooks of Hank Williams)
On the Banks of the Old Ponchartrain (co-written with Ramona Vincent)
On the Evening Train (co-written with Audrey Williams)

P
Pan American
Pictures from Life's Other Side (arranged by Hank Williams)
Please Make Up Your Mind

R
Ramblin' Man
Rockin' Chair Daddy (co-written with Gordon Schuffert)
Rose My Rose (co-written with Jimmy Fields)

S
Sermon on the Mount (lyrics by Williams, recorded by Merle Haggard for The Lost Notebooks of Hank Williams)
Singing Waterfall
Six More Miles (To the Graveyard)
Steppin' Out (co-written with Jimmy Fields)
Stranger in the Night (co-written with Bill Morgan)

T
Tank Full of Gas (co-written with Lefty Frizzell and Jimmy Fields)
A Teardrop on a Rose
Tell Me Something (co-written with Jimmy Fields)
There'll Be No Teardrops Tonight
There's a Tear in My Beer
There's Nothing as Sweet as My Baby
Time Has Proven Me Wrong
30 Pieces of Silver

W
The Waltz of the Wind
Wealth Won't Save Your Soul
We're Getting Closer To The Grave Each Day
Wearin' Out Your Walkin' Shoes
Weary Blues from Waitin'
When God Comes and Gathers His Jewels
When It Comes to Loving (co-written with Jimmy Fields)
When the Book of Life is Read
When You're Tired of Breaking Others' Hearts (co-written with Curly Williams)
Which Way (co-written with Jimmy Fields)
Why Don't You Love Me
Why Should I Cry
Why Should We Try Anymore
WPA Blues (never recorded; Williams performed the song during a talent show at The Empire Theater in 1937.)

Y
Your Cheatin' Heart
You Win Again

See also
 Hank Williams discography

References

Lists of songs by songwriters